"It's My House" is a ballad composed by the rhythm and blues writing team of Ashford and Simpson, recorded by Motown icon Diana Ross for her 1979 album release The Boss, from which it was issued as the second single on 20 October 1979.

Background and commercial reception
Valerie Simpson of Ashford and Simpson described "It's My House" with the following: "The song is about a modern woman who tells her lover: 'I'm independent and may fit you into my space - but on my terms.' Those are Diana's ideas."

The song peaked at No. 27 on the Billboard R&B chart, and (the Record World Pop Singles No. 101-No. 150 ranking would rank "It's My House" as high as No. 106).

The UK Singles Chart would afford a No. 32 peak to "It's My House", which was the third UK single from The Boss album - following the title cut and "No One Gets the Prize", both of which fared less well on the UK charts than "It's My House" (the UK chart peaks of "The Boss" and "No One Gets the Prize" being respectively No. 40 and No. 59). Ross' version of "It's My House" would also statistically best a reggae-styled cover version by Storm which despite debuting on the UK Top 75 singles ranking a week prior to the Ross single would rise no higher than No. 36.

reaching No. 71 on the Australian national singles ranking, "It's My House" would have its best global chart showing in South Africa where the Springbok Radio hit parade ranked "It's My House" as high as No. 6.

Covers and sampling
Besides the cover by Storm which reached No. 36 UK, reggae-style recordings of "It's My House" have also been made by Salena Jones (album Love is in the Air/ 1980) and Billy Biggs (album What's Your Sign/ 1980). Latin singer La Lupe covered a Spanish language version of the song ("Es Mi Casa") on her 1980 album "En algo nuevo," which also happened to be her final original album shortly before she announced her retirement. Lady Gaga's song "Replay" from her 2020 album, Chromatica, features a sample of "It's My House".

Personnel
Lead vocals by Diana Ross
Background vocals by Stephanie Spruill, Maxine Waters and Julia Waters
Produced by Ashford & Simpson

References

1979 singles
Diana Ross songs
Song recordings produced by Ashford & Simpson
1979 songs
Songs written by Nickolas Ashford
Songs written by Valerie Simpson
Motown singles